Carolyn Lee Geise (born September 8, 1935) is an American architect.

She was born Carolyn Lee Deuter in Olympia, Washington and grew up there and in Seattle. 
She earned a BA in clothing and textiles from Whitman College and then a B.Arch. from the University of Washington in 1963. During her UW architecture studies, she staffed the American Institute of Architects (AIA Seattle) booth at the 1962 Seattle World's Fair.

After graduating, she worked for Ralph Anderson and later with Jane Hastings. She established Geise Architects, her own firm, in 1978. Geise was named an American Institute of Architects (AIA) Fellow in 1989; in 2001 she received the AIA Seattle Medal. In 2005 she made a presentation of her life and career in the AIA Seattle LifeWorks Series. In 2013, she received the Housing Hero Award from the Low Income Housing Institute for designing low income housing and facilities for the community.

Geise played an important role in the revitalization of Seattle's Belltown neighborhood.

In 1962 she married John Herbert Geise, the father of their son Matt Geise.  Following their divorce, she married Bill Jobe, a Boeing engineer.

By the age of 27, Geise had climbed Mount Rainier three times. She had also worked with Jim Whittaker as a ski instructor.

Reference:  Queen Anne Historical Society "Carolyn Geise, Architect and Community Builder"
https://qahistory.org/carolyn-geise-architect-andcommunity-builder/

Selected work 
 Peter and Mell Schoening residence (1965), in partnership with Jane Hastings
 Howard and Ruth Pande residence (1974–75)
 Seattle's Children's Home Activity Center (1984)
 Child Study and Treatment Center, Steilacoom (1985)
 HomeSight low-income housing project, Seattle (1987–99)
 Growing Vine Street community project, Seattle (1994-2007), with others
 renovation of Third Church of Christ, Scientist, Seattle (2008–13)

References 

1935 births
Living people
American women architects
Architects from Seattle
University of Washington College of Built Environments alumni
People from Olympia, Washington
Whitman College alumni
21st-century American women